The men's 200 metres event at the 2007 Pan American Games was held on July 25–27.

Medalists

Results

Heats
Qualification: First 3 of each heat (Q) and the next 4 fastest (q) qualified for the semifinals.

Wind:Heat 1: +0.5 m/s, Heat 2: +0.5 m/s, Heat 3: +0.4 m/s, Heat 4: 0.0 m/s

Semifinals
Qualification: First 4 of each semifinal (Q) qualified directly for the final.

Wind:Heat 1: +0.7 m/s, Heat 2: +0.1 m/s

Final
Wind: +0.8 m/s

References
Official results

200
2007